The Platinum Collection (2006) is a compilation of Blancmange singles, album and non-album tracks.

Track listing
All songs are written by Neil Arthur & Stephen Luscombe, except where noted.

CD: 5101-16979-2
 "God's Kitchen" – 2:54
 "I've Seen the Word" – 3:04
 "Feel Me" – 5:04
 "Living on the Ceiling" – 3:59
 "Waves" – 4:07
 "Blind Vision" – 4:01
 "That's Love, That It Is" – 4:23
 "The Day Before You Came" (Andersson/Ulvaeus) – 5:50
 "What's Your Problem" – 4:10
 "Running Thin" – 2:16
 "I Can't Explain" – 3:59
 "Vishnu" – 4:45
 "Get Out of That" – 4:25
 "All Things Are Nice" – 4:58
 "Lose Your Love" – 4:04
 "Game Above My Head" – 3:57
 "Your Time Is Over" – 5:44
 "Don't Tell Me" – 3:31

2006 compilation albums
Blancmange (band) compilation albums